Suzanne Snyder (born October 22, 1962) is an American former actress.

Career
Snyder played Debbie Stone in the movie Killer Klowns from Outer Space and Beth McMillan in the Silver Spoons episodes "Daddy Rick" and "Baby Blues". She also had two roles on Seinfeld, as a neo-Nazi in the episode "The Limo", and as Jerry's girlfriend (and daughter of recurring character Poppie) who is reluctant to try a piece of apple pie in the episode "The Pie". She also played Deb (Anthony Michael Hall's character's love interest) in the 1985 teen movie Weird Science. She appeared briefly as Lisa, a sorority sister, in the 1986 movie Night of the Creeps, and played Brenda in the 1988 zombie horror comedy Return of the Living Dead Part II. She also played a blind girl named Julie who hears a murder in an episode of In the Heat of the Night (1991).

Filmography
 Class (1983)
 Gimme a Break (1983)
 The Oasis (1984)
 The Last Starfighter (1984)
 Family Ties (1985)
 The Facts of Life (1985)
 Weird Science (1985)
 Remo Williams: The Adventure Begins (1985)
 Night of the Creeps (1986)
 Prettykill (1987)
 Retribution (1987)
 Head of the Class (1988)
 Return of the Living Dead Part II (1988)
 Killer Klowns from Outer Space (1988)
 The Night Before (1988)
 The Preppie Murder (1989)
 Femme Fatale (1991)
 Seinfeld (2 episodes) (1992 & 1994)
 Fools Rush In (1997)
 Malevolence (1999)
 Dancing on a Dry Salt Lake (2010)

References

External links

Suzanne Snyder Official Site

1962 births
American film actresses
American television actresses
Actresses from Illinois
Living people
People from Park Ridge, Illinois
21st-century American women